Film Streams is a nonprofit arts organization in Omaha, Nebraska which oversees two cinemas: the Ruth Sokolof Theater, in North Downtown Omaha, and the historic Dundee Theater, Omaha's longest surviving neighborhood cinema. It receives funding from corporate and individual donors, members, and the government.

History
Founded by Rachel Jacobson in 2005, Film Streams' mission is to enhance the cultural environment of the Omaha-Council Bluffs area through the presentation and discussion of film as an art form.

In July 2007, Film Streams opened the Ruth Sokolof Theater.  This new, two-screen cinema in downtown Omaha's North Downtown (NoDo) area,  is within a development anchored by internationally acclaimed music label Saddle Creek Records. In February 2016, Film Streams announced that Susie Buffett's Sherwood Foundation had donated the 92-year-old Dundee Theater to the organization. The organization launched a public capital campaign in April 2017 with the intention of renovating and reopening the cinema by 2018. Film Streams' Dundee Theater reopened to the public on December 1, 2017.

The name "Film Streams" is inspired by Omaha (the word means "above all others on a stream") and the John Cassavetes film, Love Streams.

The Ruth Sokolof Theater
The Ruth Sokolof Theater has two auditoriums with 35-millimeter platter and reel-to-reel projection capabilities. The larger theater seats 206 and runs first run feature films. The smaller theater seats 96 and shows a selection of classic films, retrospectives, and other films. Film Streams has DVD, Blu-ray, and digital high-definition projection.

Films Streams was inspired by joining with Saddle Creek Records, the indie record label based in Omaha, to build a mini-campus in a deserted downtown Omaha area.  The block that is home to Film Streams also houses the Saddle Creek headquarters and Slowdown, a rock club the label operates.

Ruth Sokolof
Film Streams' North Downtown Omaha cinema is named after Ruth Sokolof, née Rosinsky (1925-1982), a well-known educator in Omaha who focused her life on helping children with disabilities. With her husband, Phil, many education-based scholarships are awarded in their name each year to Omaha-area students and educators.

The Dundee Theater 

Film Streams announced plans to renovate and reopen Omaha's longest-running cinema in February 2016. When it reopened, it featured two screens: the historic 300-seat main house and a new 25-seat microcinema. The lobby is occupied by Lola's, a neighborhood cafe.

Programming
Film Streams offers screenings of first-run films and a selection of retrospectives and classic films; education programs, and community development programs. 
Programming includes:
 New releases: Independent films, documentaries, and international titles making their theatrical premieres in Omaha and the surrounding region.
 Classics: Themed series, director retrospectives, and revivals celebrating the history and cultural spectrum of film as art
 Forever Young Family & Children Series
 The Met: Live in HD: Presented in collaboration with Opera Omaha
 Community Collaborations: Collaborative screenings with other nonprofit organizations, using film as a catalyst for important conversations about our community and the world around us.
 Education: Year-round film-education opportunities for all ages.
 School to Screen: An opportunity for area middle and high school to integrate film into curriculum through fields trips to the Ruth Sokolof Theater
 Courses: Multi-week seminars for adult learners
 Deep Dives: An intensive, three-hour class on a particular topic
 Special Programs: Q&As with visiting filmmakers, live musical performances to silent classics, an annual Local Filmmakers Showcase.

Fundraisers
First held in 2008 at the Holland Performing Arts Center, Film Streams' fundraising galas bring acclaimed filmmakers to Omaha for conversations about their careers and perspectives on the medium.
 Feature I (2008): Director Alexander Payne in conversation with actor Laura Dern (Sunday, July 13, 2008) 
 Feature II (2009): Director Alexander Payne in conversation with actor Debra Winger (Saturday, September 13, 2009)  
 Feature III (2011): Kurt Andersen in conversation with director Steven Soderbergh with an introduction by director Alexander Payne (Sunday, February 20, 2011) 
 Feature IV (2012): Director Alexander Payne in conversation with actor Jane Fonda (Sunday, July 22, 2012)    
 Feature V (2013): Kurt Andersen in conversation with Nebraska director Alexander Payne and actors Bruce Dern and Will Forte (Sunday, November 24, 2013)
 Feature VI (2014): Director David O. Russell in conversation with director Alexander Payne
 Feature VII (2017): Actor Julianne Moore in Conversation with director Alexander Payne
 Feature VIII (2019): Paul Giamatti in conversation with Alexander Payne
In December 2020, Film Streams held its first-ever online fundraiser, ICONS: A Conversation with Chloé Zhao.

Leadership

Board of directors
 Sarah Bay Yale, Chair
 Clarissa Beyah
 Tanya Cook
 Julie Fritz
 Jordana Glazer
 Cindy Heider, Vice Chair
 Rachel Jacobson, Founder
 Ashley Kuhn
 Mike Lebens, Past Chair
 Dan McCarthy, Treasurer
 Hillary Nather-Detisch
 Richard Webb
 Margot Wickman-Bennett, Secretary

Partners
Alley Poyner Machietto Architecture

See also
 Omaha, Nebraska: Media and popular culture
 Saddle Creek Records
 Slowdown (venue)
 Dundee–Happy Hollow Historic District

References

External links
Film Streams (official website)

Cinemas and movie theaters in Omaha, Nebraska
Repertory cinemas
Organizations based in Omaha, Nebraska
Downtown Omaha, Nebraska
Non-profit organizations based in Nebraska
2005 establishments in Nebraska
Organizations established in 2005